Bouldnor and Hamstead Cliffs is a  site of special scientific interest which is located north-east of Yarmouth. The site was notified in 1951, for both its biological and geological features.

References
Natural England citation sheet

Sites of Special Scientific Interest on the Isle of Wight